Francières may refer to the following places in France:

 Francières, Oise, a commune in the Oise department
 Francières, Somme, a commune in the Somme department